The Kings of NXT was a villainous professional wrestling stable performing in WWE on the NXT brand. The group was initially led by former NFL player Pat McAfee, and also featured Danny Burch, Oney Lorcan, Pete Dunne, and Ridge Holland, with Dunne emerging as its second leader after McAfee.

History

Background 
On July 23, 2020, Adam Cole was a guest on McAfee's podcast.  Cole became very frustrated with him during the interview for saying that The Undisputed Era was the reason for his success and that he would not have achieved all that he had on his own because he was a small guy. This would cause Cole to eventually curse out McAfee, break his microphone, push his friend and storm out of the interview. Triple H would appear on McAfee's podcast a few days later to invite him to come to an episode of NXT to talk things out with Cole.  He appeared on the August 5 episode of NXT, appearing to have made up with Cole.  However, later in the evening, as he was a guest commentator for an NXT tag team match between Bobby Fish and Kyle O'Reilly of the Undisputed Era and Fabian Aichner and Marcel Barthel of Imperium, Cole noticed him at the commentary table and began to insult and attack him, resulting in McAfee punting Cole's head. The next day, Triple H challenged McAfee to a match on behalf of Cole at NXT TakeOver: XXX, which he accepted. At the event, McAfee, in his first match for WWE, was defeated.

Formation 
McAfee returned to NXT on October 21, 2020, interfering in an NXT Tag Team Championship match between defending champions Breezango (Fandango and Tyler Breeze) against Danny Burch and Oney Lorcan, resulting in Burch and Lorcan winning the championships and aligning with McAfee, in which all three turned heel.  A week later, Pete Dunne appeared to help O'Reilly go up against McAfee, Burch and Lorcan, only to attack O'Reilly instead, aligning himself with the group as they became known as "The Kings of NXT". On December 6 at NXT TakeOver: WarGames, Team McAfee (McAfee, Dunne, Lorcan, and Burch) took on The Undisputed Era in a WarGames match. During the match, McAfee hit a senton from the top of the cage onto the other competitors, but in the end his team was defeated.

Championship pursuits 
While McAfee disappeared from the brand following the loss, Burch and Lorcan continued to align with Dunne, feuding with The Undisputed Era as well as pursuing championship success. Dunne became the #1 contender for the NXT Championship in 2021, challenging the champion Finn Bálor at NXT TakeOver: Vengeance Day on February 14. Bálor defeated Dunne at the event to retain his championship, to which Lorcan and Burch ran out to assist Dunne in attacking Bálor. Cole, O'Reilly, and Roderick Strong would come out and fend them off, only for Cole to superkick first Bálor, then O'Reilly, betraying both a mutual ally and a member of The Undisputed Era. This spurred McAfee to appear in a pre-recorded video on a plane during the February 17, 2021 episode of NXT, bragging that he was right about Cole all along.

On March 23, Burch and Lorcan were stripped of the tag team titles after Burch suffered a shoulder injury. On April 16, McAfee officially moved to the  SmackDown brand as a color commentator on April 16, 2021, marking the end of his association with the stable as well as the "Kings of NXT" name. On July 27, Ridge Holland returned from injury to help Lorcan and Dunne defeat Timothy Thatcher and Tommaso Ciampa, officially joining their alliance. Likewise, Burch returned after Holland's victory over Thatcher on August 24, running in alongside Lorcan to aid the group in a post-match beatdown of Thatcher and Ciampa. On September 27, Burch and Lorcan would challenge MSK (Nash Carter and Wes Lee) for a chance to regain the NXT Tag Team Championship. Burch and Lorcan lost, however, and were subsequently kicked out of the stable by Holland and Dunne. On the October 4 during the second night of the 2021 WWE Draft, Ridge Holland would be drafted to SmackDown, disbanding the Kings of NXT.

Aftermath 
Lorcan would be released from his WWE contract on November 2, with Burch following suit on January 5, 2022. Holland would form a protégé and mentor alliance with Sheamus on the November 19 episode of SmackDown. Dunne, after a brief face run and feud with Tony D'Angelo on NXT 2.0, would make his main roster debut on the March 11, 2022 episode of SmackDown by aligning himself with Holland and Sheamus, who introduced him by his new ring name Butch. This trio would be officially named as The Brawling Brutes on the May 27 episode of SmackDown.

Members

Members

Championships and accomplishments 
 Pro Wrestling Illustrated
Rookie of the Year (2020) – McAfee
Wrestling Observer Newsletter
Rookie of the Year (2020) – McAfee
 WWE
 NXT Tag Team Championship (1 time) – Burch and Lorcan
 NXT Year-End Award (1 time)
 Rivalry of the Year  (2020) – McAfee

References

External links 

WWE NXT teams and stables